The Taiwan Ring Expressway was a proposed, hypothetical expressway encircling the island of Taiwan as part of the National Trunk Highway System of the People's Republic of China. It never came into fruition, though, due to the political status of Taiwan. The People's Republic of China claims control over Taiwan, but has never administered it. Taiwan has its own highway system and does not recognize the designation by the People's Republic of China.

According to the People's Republic of China, the expressway would have passed through the cities of Taipei, Hsinchu, Taichung, Tainan, Kaohsiung, Taitung, Hualien, Yilan, Keelung, before returning to Taipei.

Cancellation 
In the 71118 plan of 2017, G99 was officially removed off of the books. This announcement was reaffirmed during the July 2022 expansion.

The "G99" number is currently used in the NTHS for metropolitan area ring roads (G99XX), which are somewhere between city ring roads (GXX0X) and orbitals (G9X) in degree of importance.

Notes

References 

Chinese national-level expressways
Proposed roads in Taiwan
Expressways in Taiwan Province, People's Republic of China
Cross-Strait relations